Lagoa Grande is a city in the Brazilian state of Pernambuco, 665 km away from the state's capital, Recife. The population in 2020, according with IBGE was 25,849 inhabitants and the total area is 1850.07 km².

Geography

 State - Pernambuco
 Region - São Francisco Pernambucano
 Boundaries - Santa Cruz   (N);  Bahia state   (S);  Santa Maria da Boa Vista   (E);  Petrolina and Dormentes   (W)
 Area - 1852.19 km²
 Elevation - 300 m
 Hydrography - Garças and Pontal rivers
 Vegetation - Caatinga
 Climate - Semi arid ( Sertão) hot
 Distance to Recife - 665.8 km

Economy

The main economic activities in Lagoa Grande are based in commerce and agribusiness, especially farming of goats, sheep, cattle, pigs, donkeys;  and plantations of grapes (more than 32400 tons), tomatoes, onions, guava and mangoes.

Economic Indicators

Economy by Sector
2006

Health Indicators

References

Municipalities in Pernambuco